Vishalgad (also called Vishalgarh, Khelna or Khilna) was a jagir during the Maratha Empire and then later part of the Deccan States Agency of the British Raj. It was governed by Deshastha Brahmins, who were feudatories of Kolhapur State.

Fort
A fort had existed at Vishalgad long before it became a jagir. The Maratha emperor Chhatrapati Shivaji Maharaj had escaped to it after being besieged at Panhala Fort in 1660 and in 1844 it was one of the forts of Kolhapur State that initiated a rebellion against a regent called Daji Krishna Pandit who had been installed by the British to govern the state in 1843 at a time when the natural heir to the throne was underage. He took direction from a political agent of the East India Company and among their actions were reforms to the tax of land. These reforms caused much resentment and, despite Kolhapur having refrained from involvement in the previous Anglo-Maratha Wars, a revolt against the British began in 1844. The rebellion began with soldiers locking themselves into hill-forts such as those as Panhala and Vishalgad, and then spread to Kolhapur itself.

See also
Pant Pratinidhi family
Battle of Khelna
List of forts in Maharashtra

References

Jagirs
Forts in Maharashtra
Tourist attractions in Kolhapur district